Weng Tzu-ting (born 1 July 1978) is a Taiwanese former professional tennis player. She is also known as Judy Weng.

Biography
Weng appeared in a total of 19 Fed Cup ties for Chinese Taipei and represented her country in several multi-sport competitions. She won a gold medal at the 1998 Asian Games in the team event. At the 2000 Summer Olympics, she and Janet Lee represented Chinese Taipei in the doubles, where they were beaten in the first round by Ukraine's pairing. They also partnered together at the 2001 Summer Universiade to win a bronze medal.
 
On the WTA Tour, Weng had a best singles ranking of 232 in the world.

She played her last Fed Cup tie in 2002, which was her final year on tour.

ITF Circuit finals

Singles: 4 (3 titles, 1 runner-up)

Doubles: 11 (5 titles, 6 runner-ups)

References

External links
 
 
 

1978 births
Living people
Taiwanese female tennis players
Tennis players at the 2000 Summer Olympics
Olympic tennis players of Taiwan
Universiade medalists in tennis
Asian Games medalists in tennis
Asian Games gold medalists for Chinese Taipei
Asian Games bronze medalists for Chinese Taipei
Medalists at the 1994 Asian Games
Tennis players at the 1994 Asian Games
Medalists at the 1998 Asian Games
Tennis players at the 1998 Asian Games
Universiade bronze medalists for Chinese Taipei
Medalists at the 2001 Summer Universiade
20th-century Taiwanese women